The 2003 UAB Blazers football team represented the University of Alabama at Birmingham (UAB) in the college football season of 2003, and was the thirteenth team fielded by the school. The Blazers' head coach was Watson Brown, who entered his ninth season as UAB's head coach. They played their home games at Legion Field in Birmingham, Alabama, and competed as a member of Conference USA. The Blazers finished their eighth season at the I-A level, and fifth affiliated with a conference with a record of 5–7 (4–4 C-USA).

Schedule

References

UAB
UAB Blazers football seasons
UAB Blazers football